Eccles Road railway station is on the Breckland line in the east of England, serving the villages of Eccles, Quidenham and Wilby in Norfolk.

The station is managed by Greater Anglia, which also operates most of the services calling at the station. Some East Midlands Railway also stop at Eccles Road.

The station takes its name from being outside of the now abandoned original village of Eccles  although the church Eccles St. Mary still stands and is one of 124 original round-tower churches in Norfolk.  A new settlement, also called Eccles, has developed around the station. The station is situated in the civil parish of Quidenham, about 2 miles (3 km) north of that village, and 1 mile (1.5 km) north-east of Snetterton Motor Racing Circuit.

The station is unstaffed and has two platforms, adjacent to a level crossing. Wooden level crossing gates used to be opened and closed manually by a signaller in the local signal box, which is dated 1883. However, in 2012 the signal box was closed and the crossing was renewed with automatic barriers controlled from Cambridge. The redundant signal box stands across the road from the westbound (Cambridge) platform, and was expected to be demolished when the barriers were replaced in 2017.

History

The Bill for the Norwich & Brandon Railway (N&BR) received Royal Assent on 10 May 1844. Work started on the line in 1844 and the line and its stations were opened on 30 July 1845. , The line ran from Ely to Trowse, in Norwich. The link into Norwich was delayed due to the need to build a bridge over the River Wensum that kept the river navigable. One month before the N&BR opened a Bill authorising the amalgamation of the Yarmouth & Norwich Railway with the N&BR came into effect and so Eccles Road station became a Norfolk Railway asset.

Services

On Saturday afternoons there are two westbound services to  via Cambridge, both operated by Greater Anglia.

There is no Sunday service.

References

External links

St Mary's on the European Round Tower Churches Website

Railway stations in Norfolk
Former Great Eastern Railway stations
Railway stations in Great Britain opened in 1845
Railway stations served by East Midlands Railway
Greater Anglia franchise railway stations
1845 establishments in England
Quidenham